This article is about music-related events in 1830.

Events
August 25 – A performance of Daniel Auber's La muette de Portici at La Monnaie in Brussels helps trigger the Belgian Revolution.
October
Maria Malibran, Margarethe Stockhausen and Charles de Bériot tour the English Midlands.
Felix Mendelssohn arrives in Italy.
November 2 – Frédéric Chopin, aged twenty, leaves Warsaw for Austria.
December 5 – Franz Liszt attends the first performance of Hector Berlioz's Symphonie fantastique. It inspires him to search for new expressive effects on the piano.
In Britain:
The Royal Academy of Music is granted a charter by King George IV of the United Kingdom.
Charles Lucas is appointed official composer and cellist to Queen Adelaide.

Classical music
 Frédéric Chopin
4 Mazurkas Op. 6
Piano Concerto No. 1
Revolutionary Étude, Op. 10, No. 12
 George Onslow – Symphony No. 1 in A Major
 Hector Berlioz – Symphonie Fantastique
 Felix Mendelssohn – Symphony No. 5 in D major/D minor, Op. 107, "Reformation"
Robert Schumann – Variations on the name "Abegg"

Opera
Daniel Auber – Fra Diavolo first performed in Paris.  Libretto by Eugène Scribe.
Vincenzo Bellini – La Capuleti e i Montecchi (Venice)
Gaetano Donizetti – Anna Bolena first performed in Milan.  Libretto by Felice Romani.
Jacques-François-Fromental-Elie Halévy – Attendre et courir
Louis Joseph Ferdinand Herold – L'Auberge d'Auray

Births
January 23 – Ivan Larionov, Russian composer (d. 1889)
February 11 
Peter Arnold Heise, composer (d. 1879)
Hans Bronsart von Schellendorff, composer (d. 1913)
February 13 - Cyrille Rose,  clarinetist and teacher (d. 1902)
April 13 – Eduard Lassen, conductor and composer (d. 1904)
May 18 – Karl Goldmark, composer (d. 1915)
June 22 – Theodor Leschetizky, Polish pianist, teacher, and composer (d. 1915)
July 30 – Giovanni Masutto, Italian musicologist and flautist (d.1894)
July 31 – František Zdeněk Skuherský, Czech composer and teacher (d. 1892)
August 13 – Gustav Lange, German composer (d. 1889)
September 25 – Karl Klindworth, German composer, pianist, conductor, violinist and music publisher (d. 1916)
November 27 – Harrison Millard, American composer (d.1895)
December 23 – Charlotte Alington Barnard ('Claribel'), English ballad composer (d. 1869)

Deaths
January 19 – Wenzel Thomas Matiegka, composer (b. 1773)
February 17 – Marcos Portugal, composer (b. 1762)
March 2 – Ignaz Schuppanzigh, violinist (b. 1776)
April 18 – José Maurício Nunes Garcia, composer (b. 1767)
November 25 – Pierre Rode, violinist and composer (b. 1774)
November 29 – Charles Simon Catel, composer (b. 1773)

References

 
19th century in music
Music by year